Arnas Labuckas (born December 28, 1987) is a former professional Lithuanian basketball player. Most of career spent in home country, he also played abroad for Russian, Spanish, Austrian and Latvian clubs. He was also member of youth and students' Lithuania men's national basketball team.

References

External links
 Arnas Labuckas at krepšinis.net

1987 births
Living people
Basketball players from Kaunas
Lithuanian men's basketball players
Forwards (basketball)